George Frederick Will (born May 4, 1941) is an American libertarian-conservative political commentator and author. He writes regular columns for The Washington Post and provides commentary for NBC News and MSNBC. In 1986, The Wall Street Journal called him "perhaps the most powerful journalist in America", in a league with Walter Lippmann (1889–1974). He won the Pulitzer Prize for Commentary in 1977.

Education and early career 
Will was born on May 4, 1941, in Champaign, Illinois, to Louise (née Hendrickson) and Frederick L. Will. His father was a professor of philosophy, specializing in epistemology, at the University of Illinois at Urbana–Champaign. Will attended University Laboratory High School of Urbana, Illinois where he graduated in 1959.

After high school, Will went to Trinity College in Hartford, Connecticut, graduating in 1962 with a Bachelor of Arts degree in religion. He then went to England and attended Magdalen College, Oxford, where he studied philosophy, politics and economics and received a bachelor's degree (promoted to a master's per tradition). Will then did doctoral study in political science at Princeton University, receiving a PhD in 1968 with a dissertation entitled "Beyond the Reach of Majorities: Closed Questions in the Open Society", alluding to a famous phrase from Justice Robert H. Jackson’s majority opinion in the landmark 1943 Supreme Court case West Virginia State Board of Education v. Barnette.

From 1970 to 1972, he served on the staff of Republican Senator Gordon Allott of Colorado. Will then taught political philosophy at the James Madison College of Michigan State University, and at the University of Toronto. He taught at Harvard University in 1995 and again in 1998.

Journalism career 

Will originally had left wing political views, but his views shifted toward conservatism during his studies at Oxford, especially after visiting Communist-controlled East Berlin in the mid-1960s.  Will served as an editor for National Review from 1972 to 1978. He joined  The Washington Post Writers Group in 1974, writing a syndicated biweekly column, which became widely circulated among newspapers across the country and continues today.  his column is syndicated to about 450 newspapers. In 1976 he became a contributing editor for Newsweek, writing a biweekly backpage column until 2011.

Will won a Pulitzer Prize for Commentary for "distinguished commentary on a variety of topics" in 1977. Often combining factual reporting with conservative commentary, Will's columns are known for their erudite vocabulary, allusions to political philosophers, and frequent references to baseball.

Will has also written two bestselling books on the game of baseball, three books on political philosophy, and has published eleven compilations of his columns for The Washington Post and Newsweek and of various book reviews and lectures.

From 2013 to 2017, Will was a contributor for Fox News. Prior to joining Fox News, beginning in the early 1980s, Will was a news analyst for ABC News and was a founding member on the panel of ABC's This Week with David Brinkley in 1981, now titled This Week with George Stephanopoulos. Will was a panelist on This Week until his departure from ABC News. Will was also a regular panelist on television's Agronsky & Company from 1977 through 1984. On Sunday, March 19, 2017, Meet the Press moderator Chuck Todd welcomed Will back as a panelist, stating he had been absent from the program since 1981 and that his return would mark his 52nd appearance.

On May 8, 2017, Will was announced as an MSNBC and NBC News political contributor, a paid position in which he is expected to provide regular political input on shows such as Today, Morning Joe, and The 11th Hour.

On December 3, 2020, Will received the National Society for Newspaper Columnists 2020 Ernie Pyle Lifetime Achievement Award, in partnership with the Society of Professional Journalists.

Political views

Foreign policy and national security 
Will once proposed that the United States withdraw all troops from Afghanistan and defended Barack Obama's response to the uprisings after the 2009 elections in Iran. He also criticized the Bush administration for engaging in warrantless surveillance, and supported trials for detainees at the Guantanamo Bay prison camp. On immigration, Will supports tighter border security and a "path to citizenship" for illegal immigrants.

Social issues 
Will argued that the Roe v. Wade Supreme Court decision caused a "truncation of democratic debate about abortion policy." On crime, Will is opposed to the death penalty. He thinks that higher incarceration rates make the populace safer. Additionally, Will is generally skeptical of affirmative action programs. Will favors the legalization of drugs.

Economic issues 
Will is a libertarian-style conservative who supports deregulation and low taxes as he thinks these stimulate economic growth and are more morally fair. He was opposed to both George W. Bush and Barack Obama's stimulus plans. Will supports abolishing the minimum wage and creating voluntary personal retirement accounts in order to reduce the federal cost of Social Security. In February 2013, Will wrote in support of a proposal by "relentlessly liberal" Sherrod Brown to break up consolidated banks and finance industry conglomerates, ending "too big to fail" by restoring the Glass-Steagall Act.

Campaign finance reform 
Will opposes attempts to regulate campaign funding, arguing that any such legislation is unconstitutional and would unfairly favor incumbent politicians. Additionally, he contends that spending money is a form of free speech and political participation. By giving the government power to regulate speech, Will believes that this will make the government "even bigger." Instead, he believes that we need "more speech, advocating less government" in order to reduce the importance of politics in our lives, thus indirectly reducing political spending.

Criticism of Republican politicians 
While identified with conservative politics, Will has criticized a number of individuals and policies associated with the Republican Party and American conservatism. He was among the first to oppose President George W. Bush's nomination of Harriet Miers to the United States Supreme Court.

Will was hawkish in the run-up to the invasion of Iraq in 2003, and he expressed reservations about Bush administration Iraq policies. He eventually criticized what he said was an unrealistically optimistic set of political scenarios. In March 2006, in a column written in the aftermath of the apparently sectarian bombing of the Askariya Shrine in Samarra, Will challenged the Bush administration—and U.S. government representatives in Iraq—to be more honest about the difficulties the United States faced in rebuilding and maintaining order within Iraq, comparing the White House's rhetoric unfavorably to that of Winston Churchill during the early years of World War II. Will described the optimistic assessments delivered from the Bush administration as the "rhetoric of unreality." He criticized the Bush Iraq policy, and broader White House and congressional foreign and domestic policy making, in his keynote address for the Cato Institute's 2006 Milton Friedman Prize dinner.

Will was also a harsh and early critic of both Sarah Palin and John McCain's 2008 election campaign. He criticized Palin's understanding of the role of the Vice President and her qualifications for that role. In late 2011, as the 2012 Republican Party presidential primaries approached, Will said that frontrunner Newt Gingrich "embodies almost everything disagreeable about modern Washington", and described him as "the classic rental politician". In a 2013 interview with Reason writers Nick Gillespie and Matt Welch, Will said his views have gradually but steadily become more libertarian.

Will criticized Donald Trump several times during Trump's 2016 presidential campaign, calling him a "one-man Todd Akin", and urged conservative voters to "help him lose 50 states—condign punishment for his comprehensive disdain for conservative essentials." In turn, Trump criticized Will and brought attention to the fact that his wife Mari Maseng Will was an advisor to Scott Walker's presidential campaign. Will criticized Trump again, saying Trump was a bigger threat than Hillary Clinton. In June 2016, citing his disapproval of Trump, Will told journalist Nicholas Ballasy in an interview that he had left the Republican Party and was registered as an unaffiliated voter.

In June 2019, Will asserted that the Republican Party had become a cult. In July 2020, Will announced he would vote for Joe Biden in the 2020 U.S. presidential election.

Controversies

1980 Ronald Reagan presidential campaign 

Will helped Ronald Reagan prepare for his 1980 debate against Jimmy Carter. Immediately after the debate, Will—not yet a member of the ABC News staff—appeared on ABC's Nightline. He was introduced by host Ted Koppel, who said: "It's my understanding that you met for some time yesterday with Governor Reagan", and that Will "never made any secret of his affection" for the Republican candidate. Will did not explicitly disclose that he had assisted Reagan's debate preparation, or been present during it. He went on to praise Reagan's "thoroughbred" performance, saying his "game plan worked well. I don't think he was very surprised."

In 2004 and again in 2005, Carter accused Will of giving the Reagan campaign a top-secret briefing book stolen from Carter's office before the 1980 debate. In a 2005 syndicated column, Will called his role in Reagan's debate preparation "inappropriate" but denied any role in stealing the briefing book. In response to Will's column, Carter wrote a letter to The Washington Post retracting his accusations. Carter apologized to Will for "any incorrect statement that I have ever made about his role in the use of my briefing book... I have never thought Mr. Will took my book, that the outcome of the debate was damaging to my campaign or that Mr. Will apologized to me."

2009 global sea ice level 
In a Washington Post column that expressed doubt over the effects of global warming, Will stated that: "According to the University of Illinois' Arctic Climate Research Center, global sea ice levels now equal those of 1979." This and several other claims attracted the attention of environmentalists, such as British author and activist George Monbiot. Asked to respond, the website of Arctic Climate Research at the University of Illinois states that: "We do not know where George Will is getting his information, but our data shows that on February 15, 1979, global sea ice area was 16.79 million sq. km and on February 15, 2009, global sea ice area was 15.45 million sq. km. Therefore, global sea ice levels are 1.34 million sq. km less in February 2009 than in February 1979." Will responded in a column that he accurately reported the Center's information and the challenge was mistaken. This drew a second response from Monbiot, who insisted Will had not accurately reported the Center's information. The debate continued in several forums, including a subsequent op-ed by Chris Mooney published in The Washington Post challenging Will's assertions.

Column regarding campus assaults 
Will's June 6, 2014, newspaper column about "the supposed campus epidemic of rape" was widely criticized, with Democratic U.S. senators and feminists highly critical of the article. Will wrote, "...when [colleges and universities] make victimhood a coveted status that confers privileges, victims proliferate." Will's column sparked an outcry on Twitter, with professed rape victims recounting their stories of sexual assault and violence. In The Guardian, Jessica Valenti wrote: "It takes a particular kind of ignorance to argue that people who come forward to report being raped in college are afforded benefits of any kind." In an open letter to Will, Senators Richard Blumenthal, Dianne Feinstein, Tammy Baldwin and Bob Casey wrote:

The St. Louis Post-Dispatch dropped Will's column from its pages as a result of the column. Editor Tony Messenger wrote: "The column was offensive and inaccurate; we apologize for publishing it." Will responded to the senators in his blog, saying his article was based on "simple arithmetic involving publicly available reports", and that sexual assault "should be dealt with by the criminal justice system, and not be adjudicated by improvised campus processes."

Personal life

Family 
Will has three children—Victoria, Geoffrey, and Jonathan—with his first wife, Madeleine; their eldest child, Jonathan, was born in 1972 with Down syndrome, which Will has written about in his column on occasion. In 1989, he and Madeleine divorced after 22 years of marriage.

In 1991, Will married Mari Maseng. They have one child, a son named David, born in 1992, and live in Chevy Chase, Maryland, an affluent suburb of Washington, D.C. Maseng is a political consultant and speechwriter who was in charge of communications for the Rick Perry 2012 presidential campaign, and most recently worked on Scott Walker's 2016 presidential campaign. She earlier worked on Michele Bachmann's 2012 presidential campaign, and offered her services to the Mitt Romney 2012 campaign. She previously worked for Ronald Reagan as a presidential speechwriter, deputy director of transportation, and Assistant to the President for Public Liaison. She also was a former communications director for Senator Bob Dole.

Religious beliefs 
Will is a self-described "amiable, low-voltage atheist."

Interests 

Will, a Chicago Cubs fan, has written extensively on baseball, including his best-selling book Men at Work: The Craft of Baseball. He was one of the interview subjects for Ken Burns's PBS documentary series Baseball.

References in popular culture 
Will was occasionally lampooned in the comic Doonesbury, particularly in a December 1980 sequence of strips in which several characters attend a party hosted by Will for the Reagans.

Will was lampooned in a skit on an April 1990 episode of the sketch comedy show Saturday Night Live. Dana Carvey played Will as the host of the fictional baseball trivia game show George F. Will's Sports Machine, in which the answers are all highflown literary metaphors that leave the contestants befuddled; the exasperated contestants finally get Will to try to throw a baseball, which he is unable to do.

In the Seinfeld season 6 episode "The Jimmy", Kramer mentions that he finds George Will attractive.

Honorary awards and recognition 
In addition to more than 16 honorary degrees:
 1977: Pulitzer Prize for Commentary
 1978: Headliner Award for consistently outstanding feature columns
 1979: Finalist for National Magazine Award in essays and criticism
 1980: Silurian Award for editorial writing
 1991: Silurian Award for editorial writing
 1991: First Place in Interpretive Columns: Clarion Awards from Women in Communications
 1991: Walter Cronkite Award for Excellence in Journalism., Arizona State University
 1992: Madison Medal Award, Princeton University
 1993: Honoris Causa initiate of Omicron Delta Kappa at Washington and Lee University
1993: William Allen White Award, William Allen White School of Journalism at the University of Kansas
 2003: Walter B. Wriston Lecture Award, The Manhattan Institute
 2005: Bradley Prize, The Bradley Foundation
 2006: Champion of Liberty Award, Goldwater Institute
On May 18, 2019, The Lincoln Academy of Illinois granted Will the Order of Lincoln award, the highest honor bestowed by the State of Illinois.

Works 
 The Pursuit of Happiness and Other Sobering Thoughts. Harper & Row, 1978.
 The Pursuit of Virtue and Other Tory Notions. Simon & Schuster, 1982.
 Statecraft as Soulcraft: What Government Does. Simon & Schuster, 1983.
 "New business initiatives for public policy", In: Craig E. Aronoff, John L. Ward, dir. "The Future of Private Enterprise", Vol 1, Atlanta: Georgia State University, pp169–180
 The Morning After: American Success and Excesses, 1981–1986. Free Press, 1986.
 The New Season: A Spectator's Guide to the 1988 Election. Simon & Schuster, 1987.
 Men at Work: The Craft of Baseball. Macmillan, 1990.
 Suddenly: The American Idea Abroad and at Home. Free Press, 1990.
 Restoration: Congress, Term Limits and the Recovery of Deliberative Democracy. 1992.
 The Leveling Wind: Politics, the Culture and Other News, 1990–1994. Viking, 1994.
 The Woven Figure: Conservatism and America's Fabric: 1994–1997. Scribner, 1997.
 Bunts: Pete Rose, Curt Flood, Camden Yards and Other Reflections on Baseball. Simon & Schuster, 1997.
 With a Happy Eye But...: America and the World, 1997–2002. Free Press, 2002.
 One Man's America: The Pleasures and Provocations of Our Singular Nation. Crown Publishing Group, 2008.
 A Nice Little Place on the North Side: Wrigley Field at One Hundred. Crown Archetype, 2014.
 The Conservative Sensibility. Hachette Books, 2019.
 American Happiness and Discontents. Hachette Books, 2021.

Notes

References 
 Alterman, Eric. Sound and Fury: The Making of the Punditocracy (1999) pp. 87–105 online edition
 Hoeveler, J. David, Jr. (1991) Watch on the Right: Conservative Intellectuals in the Reagan Era, chapter on Will.
 
  (Carter alleges Will's role in briefing book theft, about 28:30 into the interview)
  (Will's column rebutting briefing book allegation)
 
 
 
 Carter Letter

External links 

 Column archives  at The Daily Beast
 Column archives at The Washington Post
 Column archives at Jewish World Review, October 1999 to August 2006
 
 
 

1941 births
Living people
People from Champaign, Illinois
Sportswriters from Illinois
American broadcast news analysts
American columnists
American male non-fiction writers
American political commentators
American political writers
Baseball writers
Pulitzer Prize for Commentary winners
ABC News personalities
Fox News people
MSNBC people
National Review people
NBC News people
Newsweek people
The American Spectator people
The Washington Post people
Harvard University faculty
Michigan State University faculty
Alumni of Magdalen College, Oxford
Princeton University alumni
Trinity College (Connecticut) alumni
University Laboratory High School (Urbana, Illinois) alumni
Washington, D.C., Independents
Washington, D.C., Republicans
Criticism of Donald Trump
Critics of postmodernism
Male critics of feminism
American atheists
20th-century American journalists
American male journalists
20th-century American non-fiction writers
21st-century American journalists
21st-century American non-fiction writers
20th-century American male writers
21st-century American male writers